DWLV is the callsign of Bicol Broadcasting System's two stations in Naga, Camarines Sur: 

 DWLV-AM
 DWLV-FM, branded as BBS FM